Neylan McBaine (born 1977) is an American writer and marketer. As a writer, she focuses on topics related to women in Mormonism (Church of Jesus Christ of Latter-day Saints). She has been published in Patheos.com, PowerofMoms.com, Newsweek, Dialogue: A Journal of Mormon Thought, Segullah, Meridian Magazine and BustedHalo.com.

She wrote How to Be a Twenty-First Century Pioneer Woman (2008) and Women at Church: Magnifying LDS Women's Local Impact (2014), and is the founder and editor-in-chief of The Mormon Women Project.

As a marketer, McBaine worked in Silicon Valley in digital marketing. In 2017, she co-founded Better Days 2020, a non-profit that popularizes Utah women's history through education, legislation and art.

Biography
McBaine was born and raised in New York City. Her mother, Ariel Bybee McBaine, was a singer with the Metropolitan Opera and became known at the Met for her performance as Jenny the whore in Rise and Fall of the City of Mahagonny when she replaced Teresa Stratas on very short notice. Details of these performances can be found in the MET archives. The themes of pleasure, prostitution, debauchery, particularly with respect to the role of Jenny, were controversial but also resonated with themes of excess and exaggeration expressed by well-known popular musicians such as David Bowie in the 1970's. In the play itself, Jenny is seen waiting on multiple men who have lined up for her services and in other portions of the play, men argue over the price to spend a night with her.   

Neylan spent much of her childhood at that location. She graduated from the Chapin School and studied piano at the Juilliard School in the high school extension student extension program. She then graduated from Yale University in English literature. Her father, Jock McBaine was an attorney. 

As a newlywed after Yale, she moved to San Francisco, California and began working in public relations and marketing.  Her husband's graduate studies then took them to Boston, Massachusetts. In 2009 they settled in Salt Lake City, and McBaine became creative director at Bonneville Communications where she worked on the "I'm a Mormon" advertising project.

McBaine self-published her first book in 2009, How to be a Twenty-First Century Pioneer Woman. In 2014, Greg Kofford Books published her book Women at Church: Magnifying LDS Women's Local Impact, which addressed tensions regarding the role of women in Mormon culture, and proposes possible solutions.

In 2010 McBaine founded the Mormon Women Project, a 501c3 nonprofit that collects and publishes interviews of Mormon women from various countries around the world. As a Mormon feminist, McBaine also advocated for LDS women to lead the church's refugee-assistance efforts. She served as Chief Marketing Officer at Brain Chase Productions, maker of an online learning program for grade school students.

In 2017, McBaine co-founded Better Days 2020, a non-profit that popularizes Utah women's history through education, legislation and art. She serves as CEO of the organization, preparing Utah to celebrate the 150th anniversary of Utah being the first place a woman cast a legal ballot in the modern nation.

Publications
Books
 
 
 

Articles

  Originally presented at the 2012 FairMormon Conference. Later published in Mormon Feminism: Essential Writings (Oxford University Press, 2016), pp. 257–62.

See also 
 Mormon blogosphere
 Mormon feminism

References

External links
 Profile, MormonWomen.com; accessed April 4, 2018.
 
 List of media referencing McBaine's work, neylanmcbaine.com; accessed April 4, 2018. 
 Profile, byu.edu; accessed April 4, 2018.

American bloggers
American columnists
American Latter Day Saint writers
Juilliard School alumni
Living people
Mormon bloggers
People from Manhattan
Mormon feminists
Yale University alumni
1970s births
Journalists from New York City
Chapin School (Manhattan) alumni
Latter Day Saints from New York (state)
Latter Day Saints from Connecticut
Latter Day Saints from California
Latter Day Saints from Massachusetts
Latter Day Saints from Utah
21st-century American non-fiction writers